Syncytial virus may refer to:

 Chick syncytial virus
 Respiratory syncytial virus